State Route 267 (SR 267) is a primary state highway in the US state of Virginia. It consists of two end-to-end toll roads – the Dulles Toll Road and Dulles Greenway – as well as the non-tolled Dulles Access Road, which lies in the median of Dulles Toll Road and then extends east to Falls Church. The combined roadway provides a toll road for commuting and a free road for access to Washington Dulles International Airport. The three sections are operated and maintained by separate agencies: Dulles Toll Road and Dulles Access Road are maintained by the Metropolitan Washington Airports Authority (MWAA); the Dulles Greenway is owned by TRIP II, a limited partnership, but is maintained by Atlas Arteria, an Australian company which owns the majority stake in the partnership. The Dulles Access Road's median hosts the Silver Line of the Washington Metro between the airport and Tysons.

Dulles Access Road

The Dulles Access Road is a four-lane,  highway that runs between the westbound and eastbound roadways of the Dulles Toll Road, along the latter's median. There are no general-access exits from the westbound lanes, and no general-access entrances to the eastbound lanes, with the exception of gated slip ramps to and from the toll road that buses and emergency vehicles can use. The Access Road was built from the Beltway as part of the construction of Dulles Airport, and opened with the airport in 1962. It was extended to I-66 in 1985.

Until 2006, the Dulles Access Road was operated by the Virginia Department of Transportation (VDOT) under contract with the Metropolitan Washington Airports Authority, the owner of the land under both the Access Road and the Dulles Toll Road, and has the unsigned designation of State Route 90004. 

The Dulles Airport Access Road can be used only for travel to and from Dulles Airport and other businesses (such as air freight, hotels, and gas stations) on the airport grounds. Although it is illegal to use the Access Road without conducting such "airport business", some commuters evade the toll and the traffic on the Toll Road by taking the Access Road to the airport, then "backtracking" to their exit. For a couple of years prior to the opening of the Dulles Toll Road, VDOT issued special stickers allowing commuters (for a fee) to backtrack legally along the access highway, but these were discontinued when the toll road opened. Drivers can receive a fine and driver's license violations for using the Dulles Access Road illegally. Revenue from the fines is given to the county in which the fine is issued.

Since the opening of the Dulles Toll Road, the only major modification to the Access Road has been the construction of the Silver Line inside the median, and the construction of a flyover exit ramp from the eastbound Access Road to State Route 7. This ramp bypasses congestion associated with the main toll plaza, where traffic from Dulles Airport attempts to exit at Route 7.

Dulles Toll Road

The Dulles Toll Road is an eight-lane,  toll road that runs outside the Dulles Access Road.

History
In response to the development along the Dulles Access Road and the number of motorists who backtracked through the airport to commute to outer suburbs, the Virginia Department of Transportation determined a need for a limited access highway to serve points along the Access Road without subjecting airport traffic to congestion. It was built in 1984 by the Virginia Department of Transportation as a toll highway, because conventional funding was not available. The toll road begins just inside the Capital Beltway near West Falls Church at a connector to Interstate 66 to Washington, D.C., travels westward through Fairfax County past Dulles, and terminates at the entrance to the Dulles Greenway, a privately owned toll road that is a continuation of Route 267. Officially, the road is named the Omer L. Hirst – Adelard L. Brault Expressway, in honor of two Virginia state legislators. However, the road is rarely referred to by that name.

A third lane was built to serve HOV traffic in 1992. For a short period between the end of construction and the start of HOV limits, drivers of single passenger vehicles used the lane and contacted government officials opposing the HOV policy. In response, Congress (which did not have direct control over the highway) passed special legislation prohibiting the imposition of HOV restrictions on the route. As a compromise to resolve the situation, Virginia decided to lift the HOV restriction and to construct a fourth lane in each direction to serve HOV traffic.  However, unlike the third lane, officials did not allow non-HOV use at the end of construction in 1998, and avoided a repeat of the controversy. As a practical matter, the right of way could not fit any additional lanes other than the current six in each direction. However, Rep. Frank Wolf again threatened to pass federal legislation prohibiting the fourth lane to be limited to HOV traffic.

In 2005, five companies submitted proposals to VDOT to privatize the toll road which included payments to Virginia that could be used for transportation. In response MWAA made its own proposal to take over operation of the toll road from VDOT, assuming associated debts, and commit to building a rapid transit line in the median. VDOT agreed and, on March 27, 2006, MWAA took over from Virginia the operation of the Dulles Toll Road, including the outstanding debt and the obligation to construct the Silver Line in the median strip of the toll road. The first phase of the Silver Line (east of Reston) opened in July 2014, while the second phase (west of Reston) opened in November 2022.

Description

From the Beltway, motorists exiting onto SR 267 toward Dulles Airport must choose between lanes marked Airport Traffic Only and To All Local Exits; the Airport Traffic Only lanes lead to the two westbound lanes of the Access Road. Eastbound traffic is routed differently; Dulles-originating traffic can choose destinations between Herndon exits (putting them on the mainline Toll Road) or further on (starting them on the Access Road), and transfer exits are provided from the Access Road to the Toll Road before the Herndon exits, Reston exits, and the Beltway. Access Road traffic to State Route 7 gets a separate exit ramp from those of the Toll Road, and then the two eastbound segments merge before the junction with Interstate 66.

Through December 31, 2013, a main toll plaza west of the Beltway interchange collects a $1.75 toll in both directions for two-axle vehicles. Toll booths located on westbound exit ramps and eastbound entrance ramps collect tolls of $1.00, except at the Route 7 interchange, where tolls are only collected from Route 267 east to Route 7 east.  Vehicles with more than two axles are charged higher rates.  All tollbooths are equipped with electronic toll collection systems which accept E-ZPass or a compatible system. Fifty cents of each toll is attributable to the financing of the Silver Line to Dulles Airport.  On November 14, 2012, the MWAA Board of Directors voted to increase the toll by 25¢ (from $1.50 to $1.75 at the main toll plaza and from 75¢ to $1.00 at the ramp toll booths) effective January 1, 2013; and to increase the toll by an additional 75¢ to $2.50 at the main toll plaza effective January 1, 2014.  The 2013 and 2014 toll increases primarily help pay for Phase 1 Silver Line Metrorail construction costs.

HOV-2 restrictions are in effect during weekday rush hours, 6:30 to 9:00 am eastbound and 4:00 to 6:30 pm westbound, limiting the left lane to vehicles with two or more passengers between State Route 28 and the main toll plaza. Motorcycles and approved clean fuel vehicles displaying a Clean Special Fuel license plate are exempt from this rule, meaning single passenger vehicles of this nature may use the left lane. Traditional hybrid vehicles such as the Toyota Prius that do not plug in are no longer exempt from HOV rules. During rush hour, the appropriate directions of Interstate 66 between the Beltway and U.S. Route 29 just outside Washington are toll roads. Single-passenger vehicles bound to or from the airport using the Dulles Access Road must pay tolls using an E-ZPass. Vehicles with 2 or more people may switch their E-ZPass Flex into HOV mode to avoid being charged for tolls. These regulations are enforced by the Virginia State Police.

Dulles Greenway

The Dulles Greenway is a privately owned toll road in Northern Virginia, running for 12.53 miles (20.17 km) northwest from the end of the Dulles Toll Road to the Leesburg Bypass (U.S. Route 15/State Route 7). 
The northbound side of the freeway leads directly onto US-15 North at its termination, thus forming a continuous route towards Frederick, MD and beyond. Although privately owned, the highway is also part of SR 267.

The road was privately built and is not a public asset. The current owner is "Toll Road Investors Partnership II" (TRIP II), which was a consortium of the Bryant/Crane Family LLC, the Franklin L. Haney Co., and Kellogg Brown & Root (KB&R). On August 31, 2005, Australian firm Macquarie Infrastructure Group (now Atlas Arteria) announced that they had paid $533 million to TRIP II to acquire its 86.7% ownership of the Greenway, and were negotiating with KB&R for the remaining ownership rights. Initially, as the road was built as a "Design Build Finance Operate Maintain" (DBFOM) project, the responsibility for operating the road was scheduled to revert to Virginia in 2036 via a concession agreement. In 2001, The Virginia State Corporation Commission extended this period to the year 2056.

History

The road was envisioned as early as the 1970s, when new residents were attracted to Loudoun County because of the relatively low cost of real estate. The Greenway proposal prompted the enactment of the Virginia Highway Corporation Act of 1988 that authorizes the construction of new toll roads without the use of eminent domain under rates set by the Virginia Corporation Commission.  The law requires the facility to be turned over to the state after a stated time period. The road was completed and opened in 1995, but the original owners defaulted on its loan due to lower than projected use.  It receives no public funds, was built with no subsidies, and is policed at its own expense, competing as a wholly private enterprise with the state-built and -maintained roads. Tolls are computed to assure that the owner will recover the original investment plus a return on that investment.  The losses incurred during the early years of the project are rolled forward to justify higher tolls in later years.  Subsequent improvements, which were constructed in exchange for the aforementioned extension of the toll road to 2056, include adding a third lane in each direction, resurfacing the entire road in 2009, and the construction of an improved eastbound exit ramp to Dulles Airport in 2009.

Description
The main toll plaza for the Dulles Greenway is located just west of the exits for Route 28 and Dulles Airport.  Additional toll plazas are located on westbound entrance ramps and eastbound exit ramps with the exception of Battlefield Parkway (Exit 2) in Leesburg.  The toll varies depending on the toll plaza traversed.  , the base toll collected for two-axle vehicles ranges from $3.00 ($2.55 with E-ZPass) at the Shreve Mill Rd plaza to $5.10 at the main plaza to and from the Dulles Toll Road (which includes the $1.00 toll for the Dulles Toll Road). Vehicles with more than two axles are charged higher rates.  The maximum toll rises to $5.90 (including the 75¢ Dulles Toll Road toll) during congestion pricing hours, which are 6:30 am to 9:00 am eastbound and 4:00 pm to 6:30 pm westbound. A previous increase in the base fare and the introduction of congestion pricing occurred in January 2009, and tolls rose an additional 30 cents per trip on January 1, 2012.  Vehicles traveling through the main toll plaza to or from the Dulles Toll Road are charged two tolls: one for the Dulles Toll Road, and one for the Dulles Greenway.  Cash tolls are accepted during limited hours, and credit cards and E-ZPass transponder payments are accepted at all times.

The Greenway is also one of two routes where a subscription membership (exclusive to E-ZPass) allows for an additional discount. Alternate (free) routes include State Route 7 and State Route 28, both of which are generally more congested.

The Greenway was later widened to six lanes from the mainline toll plaza to Leesburg. Use of the Greenway has grown, reflecting the increased population of Loudoun County. In 1996, the Greenway served 6.3 million trips, growing to 21 million in 2006. However, for the first three months following the January 2009 toll increase, usage dropped 8% compared to the first three months of 2008.

Controversies
The 1988 statute authorizing the private toll road permitted toll increases above the rate of inflation under a three-part test: (1) the new fee must not "materially discourage" drivers from using the road, (2) the company must not make more than a "reasonable rate of return" from the increase, and (3) the road's benefit must match its cost.  Critics claim that the drop in use following the 2009 toll increase is evidence that the test has not been met.  Representative Frank Wolf, the Congressman representing the area served by the road, stated, "It's highway robbery.  It's a disgrace.  Everyone knows that these tolls are ripping people off and there's not much we can do about it."

Exit list

Dulles Toll Road and Dulles Greenway
SR 267 uses sequential exit numbering rather than the distance-based exit numbering used throughout most of Virginia.

Dulles Access Road

See also 
 Dulles Technology Corridor
 Private highway

References

External links

 Metropolitan Washington Airports Authority – Dulles Toll Road
 VDOT – Dulles Toll Road
 Dulles Greenway website
 Dulles Airport Access Road and Dulles Toll Road (VA 267) at Steve Anderson's DCRoads.net
 Virginia Highways Project: VA 267
 Welcome to Dulles Toll Road, of the Washington Airport Authority
 VA Route 267 map: Dulles Toll Road, from the Washington Airport Authority
 VDOT: Virginia Toll Facilities FAQ
 History of Washington Dulles International Airport (see the section on "Access Roads")
 Dulles Rapid Mass Transit Corridor

267
State Route 267
State Route 267
Toll roads in Virginia
Freeways in the United States
1982 establishments in Virginia
Dulles International Airport